The following is a list of unproduced James Cameron projects in roughly chronological order. During his long career, Canadian film director James Cameron has worked on a number of projects which never progressed beyond the pre-production stage under his direction. Some of these projects fell into development hell or are officially cancelled.

1980s

Piranha II: The Spawning 
In 1981, Cameron was originally hired as the special effects director for Piranha II: The Spawning and took over the direction when the original director, Miller Drake, was fired (Cameron also re-wrote the screenplay under the pseudonym H. A. Milton). Due to budget limitations the crew was composed essentially of Italians, none of whom spoke English. Some however did have prior experience on horror/fantasy movies so they were, to some extent, able to satisfy Cameron's requirements.

After the first week of shooting, the set harmony was disturbed by some discussions about the work between the director and the producers (the executive producer, Ovidio G. Assonitis, asked to verify the day-to-day activities, arguing with most of Cameron's choices), so while Cameron was only responsible for the shooting, most of the decisions were under Assonitis' authority. According to Dreaming Aloud, a biography of Cameron by Christopher Heard, Cameron was not allowed to see his footage and was not involved in editing. He broke into the editing room in Rome and cut his own version while the film's producers were at Cannes, but was caught and Assonitis recut it again. Most of the film was reshot by Assonitis after Cameron was fired. In an interview, Cameron stated: "I was replaced after two-and-a-half weeks by the Italian producer. He just fired me and took over, which is what he wanted to do when he hired me. It wasn't until much later that I even figured out what had happened. It was like, 'Oh, man, I thought I was doing a good job.' But when I saw what they were cutting together, it was horrible. And then the producer wouldn't take my name off the picture because [contractually] they couldn't deliver it with an Italian name. So they left me on, no matter what I did. I had no legal power to influence him from Pomona, California, where I was sleeping on a friend's couch. I didn't even know an attorney. In actual fact, I did some directing on the film, but I don't feel it was my first movie."

Rambo: First Blood Part II 
In 1984, Cameron wrote a first draft under the title First Blood II. (Cameron had been recommended by David Giler who did some uncredited script work on the first film.) Cameron's script had the same basic structure of the first film but had the character of Rambo's partner before later drafts were written by star Sylvester Stallone. Stallone's final draft differed radically from Cameron's initial vision.

Producers considered that Rambo would have a partner in the rescue mission of POWs. The producers allegedly wanted John Travolta to play Rambo's partner, but Stallone vetoed the idea. Lee Marvin (who was considered to play Colonel Trautman in the first film) was offered the role of Marshall Murdock, but declined, leading to the role being played by Charles Napier. Stallone later recalled: "I think that James Cameron is a brilliant talent, but I thought the politics were important, such as a right-wing stance coming from Trautman and his nemesis, Murdock, contrasted by Rambo's obvious neutrality, which I believe is explained in Rambo's final speech. I realize his speech at the end may have caused millions of viewers to burst veins in their eyeballs by rolling them excessively, but the sentiment stated was conveyed to me by many veterans.... [Also] in his original draft it took nearly 30-40 pages to have any action initiated and Rambo was partnered with a tech-y sidekick. So it was more than just politics that were put into the script. There was also a simpler story line. If James Cameron says anything more than that, then he realizes he's now doing the backstroke badly in a pool of lies."

Alien Nation 
An earlier draft of the 1988 film Alien Nation was actually written by Cameron in 1987, but his name, however, was not credited in the final cut of the film. Rockne S. O'Bannon received solo credit of writing the script, which deviated much from earlier drafts.

Wolverine and the X-Men 
Around 1989, Stan Lee and Chris Claremont entered in talks with Carolco Pictures and Lightstorm Entertainment to make a film adaptation of the X-Men comic book series, with Cameron as producer, Kathryn Bigelow as director and Gary Goldman as writer. Bob Hoskins was slated to star as Wolverine and Angela Bassett was attached to star as Storm. Claremont also contacted Marvel Comics editor-in-chief Jim Shooter to revive the character of Jean Grey due to the character's demise in The Dark Phoenix Saga comic book storyline. However, the project entered into development hell when Lee piqued Cameron's interest on the long planned Spider-Man film and after the defunction of Carolco Pictures. The film was finally released in 2000 with Bryan Singer as director.

1990s

Jurassic Park 
In May 1990, Cameron attempted to buy the rights to make a film adaptation of Michael Crichton's novel Jurassic Park. However, Steven Spielberg bought the rights by a mere few hours before Cameron could do so. The film was released in 1993 and directed by Spielberg. Since the film's release, Cameron has admitted that after he saw Spielberg's Jurassic Park, he realized that he was not the right person to make the film.

Point Break 
On the 1991 American buddy cop action crime thriller film Point Break, only W. Peter Iliff is credited for the screenplay, but Cameron has said that he did a considerable amount of writing with the film's director Kathryn Bigelow for the final film. Cameron is only credited as an executive producer on the final product.

The Crowded Room 
In 1991, after finishing the filming of Terminator 2: Judgment Day, Cameron tried to get the rights of Daniel Keyes' non-fiction novel The Minds of Billy Milligan. In 1994, Keyes published a sequel novel entitled The Milligan Wars, stating that he published the novel for being a tie-in with the film adaptation, entitled The Crowded Room, which would be developed by Warner Bros. and with Cameron attached to direct, after buying the rights of the novel to Sandy Arcara. John Cusack was attached to play Billy Milligan and Cameron and Todd Graff wrote the screenplay. However, Cameron finally left the project for unknown reasons. In December 2006, veteran film director Joel Schumacher was attached to direct the film. with a projected release date of 2008, but the project remained unfinished. In 2015 Leonardo DiCaprio announced that his company Appian Way Productions was producing The Crowded Room, with DiCaprio set to star. As of 2020, no further plans have been announced.

Terminator 3 (James Cameron's version) 
During the 1990s, Cameron said many times that he was interested in directing a third Terminator film. After the bankruptcy of Carolco Pictures in 1997, the developer of Terminator 2: Judgment Day, Cameron and 20th Century Fox were in talks about the production of a possible third Terminator film. However, at the end, Cameron left the production of the third film to direct Titanic. Arnold Schwarzenegger originally intended to not reprise his role as The Terminator after learning that Cameron was not going to direct the film and tried to convince him to work at least as producer, but Cameron declined. The film was finally released as Terminator 3: Rise of the Machines in 2003 and directed by Jonathan Mostow. Cameron co-wrote and co-produced his vision with Terminator: Dark Fate, which ignores Terminator 3: Rise of the Machines, Terminator Salvation and Terminator Genisys, picking up after Terminator 2: Judgment Day. The film was released in United States by Paramount Pictures and internationally by 20th Century Fox (through Walt Disney Studios Motion Pictures via Buena Vista International) on November 1, 2019.

Spider-Man 
After finishing the filming of True Lies, on September 1, 1993, Variety reported that Cameron had sent a screenplay (apparently written in 1991) to Carolco Pictures for the long-planned live-action adaptation of the Marvel Comics character Spider-Man, a theatrical project that had been in production hell since 1985. Leonardo DiCaprio was attached to play Spider-Man, and Cameron's frequent collaborator Arnold Schwarzenegger was attached to play Doctor Octopus. Cameron's planned screenplay featured a darker, R-rated and mature re-imagining of the classic Spider-Man origin story, with the storyline focusing on academically-gifted, yet outcasted high school student:
Peter Parker, being bitten by a mutated spider during a scientific demonstration, which later results in Parker developing spider-like superhuman abilities. After initially attempting to use his abilities for personal gain, his selfishness leads to him encountering and refusing to stop an armed robber from escaping from a local TV station, which later results in the tragic murder of his adoptive father-figure/uncle: Ben Parker. Guilt-ridden, Peter is later driven to use his new abilities as a masked vigilante:
"Spider-Man", to atone for his partial responsibility in his uncle's death. While balancing high school life, Peter struggles to do good and help others under his Spider-Man alter-ego, while vying for the attentions of his classmate and crush: Mary Jane-Watson, with whom he develops a blossoming romance. Cameron's script also contained heavy profanity, mature themes, sexual content and a significantly grittier, edgier and adult-oriented tone and direction, compared to other cinematic Spider-Man adaptations. However, after problems that producer Menahem Golan had with Carolco (which ended in the bankruptcy of the latter), Cameron left the project and signed a contract with 20th Century Fox. The film was finally released in 2002 directed by Sam Raimi and written by David Koepp.

Project 880 
In 1994, Cameron finished the screenplay of Project 880, his next planned film. The script was about a man named Josh Sully traveling to the planet Pandora and falling in love with the native alien Zuleika. In August 1996, Cameron stated that he would direct Project 880 after finishing the filming of Titanic, and that the film would be released in 1999. However, Cameron felt that the technology of that time was not enough and realistic for the project, putting it on hold. Finally, in October 2005, 20th Century Fox greenlit the production of the project. Jon Landau was to produce the film. However, Cameron made many changes to the Project 880 script, and it was finally released in 2009 as Avatar.

Strange Days 
The filming of the 1995 film Strange Days SQUID scenes, which offer a point-of-view shot (POV), required multi-faceted cameras and considerable technical preparation. A full year was spent building a specialized camera that could reproduce the effect of looking through someone else's eyes. Bigelow revealed that it was essentially "a stripped-down Arri that weighed much less than the smallest EYMO and yet it would take all the prime lenses." Cameron and cinematographer Matthew F. Leonetti helped Bigelow direct the scenes, which were choreographed weeks in advance, but remained uncredited for their directorial work. According to Cameron, "It's a major set piece. For the jump alone, we built special cameras, special rigs. We designed transitions that would work seamlessly. It was a very technical scene that doesn't look technical." Cameron was only credited as a cowriter and coproducer on the final product.

Anne Rice's The Mummy 
In May 1996, 20th Century Fox acquired the film rights to Anne Rice's The Mummy from Carolco with Cameron set to direct before the rights lapsed.

Planet of the Apes 
In 1996, Cameron intended to direct a reboot of Planet of the Apes, after the poor reception of Battle for the Planet of the Apes in 1973. In 1998, Cameron was to write and produce the movie, while Peter Hyams was to direct the film and Arnold Schwarzenegger was to star in the role of George Taylor. According to Cameron, he had great ideas for the movie, including Caesar traveling in time and discovering an ape society more technologically advanced. However, Cameron left the project after the successful reception of Titanic. The reboot was finally released in 2001 and directed by Tim Burton.

Fantastic Voyage 
In 1997, Cameron expressed his desire to direct a remake of Richard Fleischer's Fantastic Voyage, but he left the project to focus on Project 880. Despite this, he still planned to make a remake based on his script. In 2007, 20th Century Fox hired Roland Emmerich to direct a remake with Cameron as writer, but Emmerich rejected Cameron's script. In spring 2010, Paul Greengrass revealed his intentions to direct a remake with Cameron as producer and Shane Salerno as writer, but he was eventually replaced by Shawn Levy, who intended to shoot the film in stereoscopic 3-D. On January 7, 2016, it was revealed that Mexican film director Guillermo del Toro is attached to direct the film, along the announcement that David S. Goyer and Justin Rhodes will be the writers and that Cameron will produce the film with his production company Lightstorm Entertainment. 
In August 2017, it was reported that del Toro had postponed working on the film to completely focus on his film The Shape of Water.

Dungeons & Dragons 
In 1997, Cameron was attached to a film adaptation of Dungeons & Dragons just before he did Titanic (1997), but the deal did not suffice due to TSR, Inc.'s failure to come up with a merchandising deal that appealed to 20th Century Fox, where Cameron worked. Potential deals with Paramount Pictures and Lightstorm Entertainment were also destroyed due to strong disagreements on how to finance the film.

Solaris 
In 1998, Cameron was looking to remake Andrei Tarkovsky's Solaris. His production company Lightstorm Entertainment spent close to five years securing the rights with both the novel's author Stanisław Lem and the film's production studio Mosfilm. However, because of his many commitments in the 1990s, Cameron was unable to take on directing duties. In 2000, around the time Steven Soderbergh was working on Traffic, Soderbergh pitched his ideas of a Solaris film adaptation to Cameron and Lightstorm producers Rae Sanchini and Jon Landau. Cameron was thrilled with what he heard and development began on the project. The film was released in 2002, directed and written by Soderbergh. After seeing the film, Cameron stated: "What I would've done would’ve been more like The Abyss, where visual set pieces might have gotten in the way of what is a clean line as a relationship film. [Soderbergh]'s not interested in the hardware or the visual effects very much, which is good.

Bright Angel Falling 
In 1998, Cameron began working on a screenplay titled Bright Angel Falling, with the help of fellow writer-director and friend Peter Hyams. The script tells the story of a massive meteor on a collision course with the Earth and the efforts of a team of brave astronauts to stop it, while also detailing the main characters' personal struggles and issues. Unfortunately the script got leaked online before the film could enter production and the project was abandoned.

2000s

True Lies 2 

After the successful reception of his True Lies film, Cameron and Arnold Schwarzenegger decided to make a sequel entitled True Lies 2. Cameron planned to release it after directing Titanic, with a potential release date in 2002. Schwarzenegger was attached to reprise his role as Harry Tasker/Harry Rehnquist. Also, Tom Arnold, who portrayed Albert 'Gib' Gibson in the original film, revealed at one point that the sequel's script was written. However, the production of the sequel was cancelled.

Alien 5 
In an interview on January 23, 2002, Ridley Scott expressed interest in making a fifth installment of the Alien film franchise. He stated that the fifth film would explain the Aliens' origins and where they were discovered. Alien: Resurrection screenwriter Joss Whedon had previously written a script for the film, but Sigourney Weaver disliked it. Cameron also discussed his possible return as director for the installment, but he finally decided to only work on the project as writer and producer (because he worked on the film's story). Weaver was attached to reprise her role as Ellen Ripley. However, the project was finally shelved by 20th Century Fox since they felt that they would ruin the franchise with a fifth film. The film would eventually become the prequel Prometheus. In 2004, Alien vs. Predator was released instead, as the first installment of the Alien vs. Predator spin-off franchise. Despite Weaver's and Michael Biehn's hopes to reprise their roles and director Neill Blomkamp's hopes to direct the film, on May 1, 2017, Scott stated that Alien 5, whose title would have been Alien: Awakening, was officially cancelled. In October 2018, Weaver stated that Cameron wanted it to be produced. In February 2019, Cameron stated that he was working on reviving the project.

Dark Angel season 3 
On May 3, 2002, Cameron and the producers of Dark Angel were initially told a third season had been approved, but two days later Fox informed them that the series had been cancelled. Cameron said, "They called us on Saturday and told us we were on schedule and we'd been picked up. We got together Saturday night and celebrated. Sunday goes by, and Monday morning we get a call saying, 'No, you're not on the schedule! It's been changed.' I've never heard of that happening. But then, I'd never been around television. ... We were supposed to be on a plane on Monday to go to the [network] upfront in New York on Tuesday. They called us that day and told us not to go! I was pissed!" This storyline is expanded upon in the final Dark Angel novel After the Dark though when the comet returns nobody falls ill, and it is believed that the cult simply had a false prediction.

Battle Angel Alita 

On April 17, 2003, it was reported by Moviehole that Cameron had signed with 20th Century Fox to direct a film adaptation of the Yukito Kishiro's manga Battle Angel Alita. On November 22, 2004, Cameron stated that the film would be released after finishing the filming of his documentary film Aliens of the Deep. However, on June 16, 2005, The Hollywood Reporter reported that the production of Battle Angel Alita would be delayed since Cameron decided to first direct Project 880 (which would later become Avatar). On June 29, 2006, Cameron stated that Battle Angel Alita would be the first film of a trilogy. After other delays, like Cameron's work on the first two Avatar sequels, Cameron finally left the project. However, it was finally revealed on October 14, 2015, that the film would be released on December 21, 2018, with Robert Rodriguez as director and Cameron as producer, along with frequent collaborator producer Jon Landau. On September 28, 2018, the film was pushed back to February 14, 2019. The film held its world premiere on January 31, 2019, at the Odeon Leicester Square in London, and was released in the United States on February 14, 2019.

Doomsday Protocol 
In December 2009, Cameron was developing a script called Doomsday Protocol for Fox. There have been no further announcements.

2010s

Heavy Metal 
In March 2008, Variety reported that Paramount Pictures was set to make another animated film with David Fincher "spearheading the project". Kevin Eastman, who is the current owner and publisher of Heavy Metal, will direct a segment, as will Tim Miller, "whose Blur Studio will handle the animation for what is being conceived as an R-rated, adult-themed feature". Entertainment website IGN announced, on July 14, 2008, "David Fincher's edgy new project has suffered a serious setback after it was dropped by Paramount, according to Entertainment Weekly." However, Entertainment Weekly quoted Tim Miller as saying "David really believes in the project. It's just a matter of time."

In September 2008, Eastman was quoted as saying "Fincher is directing one, Guillermo del Toro wants to direct one, Zack Snyder wants to direct one, Gore Verbinski wants to direct one". It was reported that the film had been moved to Sony division Columbia Pictures (which had released the original) and had a budget of $50 million. In June 2009, Eastman said "I've got breaking news that Fincher and Cameron are going to be co-executive producers on the film, Cameron will direct one. Mark Osborne and Jack Black from Tenacious D were going to do a comedy segment for the film."

However, production is stalled indefinitely, as no film distributor or production company has shown interest in distributing or producing the remake since Paramount Pictures decided to forgo being the film's distributor, who purportedly thought such a film was "too risqué for mainstream audiences". In July 2011, filmmaker Robert Rodriguez announced at the Comic-Con that he had purchased the film rights to Heavy Metal and planned to develop a new animated film at the new Quick Draw Studios. However, on March 11, 2014, with the formation of his very own television network, El Rey, Rodriguez considered switching gears and bringing it to TV.

Terminator 3000 
In August 2010, Hannover House announced plans to develop a 3D animated film titled Terminator 3000, with Cameron in a producing role. Pacificor responded with a cease and desist letter, declining a $20–30 million offer from Hannover for the rights to produce the film, killing the project.

The Last Train from Hiroshima: The Survivors Look Back 
On August 12, 2010, Entertainment Weekly reported that Cameron was working on a biographical film about Tsutomu Yamaguchi, a Japanese man that survived both the Atomic bombings of Hiroshima and Nagasaki in 1945. The film's title was announced as Last Train to Hiroshima. Cameron met Yamaguchi just days before he died. The film would be based on the book of the same by Charles R. Pellegrino. However, the project entered into development hell after Cameron decided to first focus on the Avatar sequels.

At the Mountains of Madness 
On July 28, 2010, it was announced that Cameron would produce a film adaptation of H. P. Lovecraft's At the Mountains of Madness for Universal Pictures, with Mexican film director Guillermo del Toro as director. The movie was originally set up as a project at DreamWorks in 2004, but it was cancelled. Cameron suggested casting Tom Cruise in the lead role and releasing the film in 3-D.

In June 2010, del Toro said that the adaptation probably would not happen at all. He stated, "It doesn't look like I can do it. It's very difficult for the studios to take the step of doing a period-set, R-rated, tentpole movie with a tough ending and no love story. Lovecraft has a readership as big as any best-seller, but it's tough to quantify because his works are in the public domain." Cameron and Del Toro put forward the idea to Universal, who greenlit it.
Earlier that same year, del Toro had also asked S. T. Joshi if he wanted to be a consultant once the movie got into production.
However, due to many delays, Cameron and del Toro left the project after del Toro realized that the film would have been very similar to Ridley Scott's 2012 film Prometheus.

Untitled Avatar prequel 
On May 5, 2012, Cameron expressed his desire to direct a prequel to his acclaimed and successful Avatar film, with Sigourney Weaver slated to reprise her role as Dr. Grace Augustine. The film was originally supposed to be shot back-to-back with the second and third installment, as the prequel was supposed to be the fourth installment in the franchise. However, on September 8, 2012, Cameron revealed that the prequel will not be shot back-to-back with the second and the third films. Also, in April 2016, it was stated by Cameron that the fourth and fifth installments are planned to be sequels like the first two, leaving the fate of the prequel project unknown.

The Informationist 
On October 23, 2012, Los Angeles Times reported that Cameron had acquired the rights to direct a film adaptation of Taylor Stevens's novel The Informationist for 20th Century Fox. Cameron's Lightstorm Entertainment was attached to develop the film. He announced that he would direct the film after finishing his work on the first two Avatar sequels. The film's release was planned to be in 2016, but no film was made, implying that the project was likely abandoned after the announcement of two more Avatar installments.

Terminator television series 
By December 2013, Skydance Productions and Annapurna Pictures were developing a new Terminator television series with Cameron. Ashley Miller and Zack Stentz were named as writers and executive producers. The series was said to deviate from the franchise's history at a critical moment in 1984's The Terminator, and would also integrate with then-projected film series' direct sequels to Terminator Genisys. With the rights reverting to Cameron in 2019, the planned television series connected to Terminator Genisys has since been cancelled.

The Dive 
After Audrey Mestre accident, Francisco Ferreras wrote The Dive, which became an international bestseller. In 2015, Cameron acquired the movie rights and was producing the film. Oscar-winning actress Jennifer Lawrence, star of The Hunger Games, Silver Linings Playbook and Joy, had been cast to play Audrey Mestre. Francis Lawrence, director of The Hunger Games, was directing. The film was being compared to Cameron's earlier blockbuster movie, Titanic, and was scheduled to be released in 2017. Since then, there has been no further announcements.

References 

unrealized Projects
Cameron James